Lucky Brand is an American denim company founded in Vernon, California in 1990 by Gene Montesano and Barry Perlman. Lucky also produces other apparel, including activewear, outerwear, T-shirts, and professional attire.

In 2020, Lucky Brand filed for bankruptcy. It was then acquired by SPARC Group, owner of brands like Brooks Brothers, Nautica, Aéropostale, and Forever 21. These brands are part of the Authentic Brands Group.

History 

In the 1970s, 21-year-old Jamal H and Nathan along with and 17-year-old Barry Perlman opened a Florida jeans shop called Four Way Street.  "During the evenings, we'd head out to the local Laundromat with our pockets full of coins and some bleach. A few hours later, we had a stack of great washed jeans -- one of a kind and 100% authentic!"

In 1978, Montesano moved to Los Angeles to enter the fashion industry there. With business partner Michael Caruso, he started Bongo and ran the brand for 15 years.  After leaving Bongo, Montesano joined former business partner Perlman in 1990 to launch Lucky Brand.

The corporate headquarters moved from Vernon to the Arts District in Downtown Los Angeles in 2012. The jeans maker moved to a new downtown office located at 540 S. Santa Fe near the historic 4th and 6th Street Bridges.

In December 2013, Leonard Green & Partners acquired Lucky Brand Jeans for $225 million from Fifth & Pacific Companies. In 2019, Carlos Alberini had resigned as Chairman and CEO. In July 2020, Lucky Brand filed for bankruptcy, and was acquired by Authentic Brands Group.

Product 

All of the products sold by Lucky as well as their stores' decorations reflected a bohemian style. Denim is the major selling point of the company, making up about 60% of business. All Lucky Brand Jeans have two four-leaf clovers with the phrase "LUCKY YOU!" stitched onto the outside of the fly shield.  This has become a trademark of their denim line, which is made up of a wide variety of fits and washing.

In 2005, the company expanded its line to include clothing for infants through age 10. In 2006, the company opened Lucky Brand Jeans Kid stores, which exclusively sell their children's clothing.

Prior to 2010, most Lucky products were manufactured in the USA. They are currently made in Indonesia, China, Peru, Chile, Vietnam, Mexico, Sri Lanka and Haiti. Lucky jeans manufactured in the United States are hand-made in Los Angeles, and the detailing is done by hand, except for the washing process.

In the summer of 2013, Lucky re-introduced Made in America (MIA) jeans. The denim is produced by Cone Denim in their White Oak Mill in Greensboro, North Carolina. The jeans are then hand-stitched in Los Angeles. Almost every style of women's and men's jeans has an MIA counterpart.

Operations
Lucky is currently run by an "Office of the CEO" established on January 28, 2019 when Carlos Alberini stepped down as Chairman and Chief Executive Officer. Alberini left to take the role of CEO and Director at Guess, where he was COO from 2000 to 2010. Alberini had served as CEO of Lucky since taking the post on January 31, 2014.  David DeMattei was the former CEO.

There are 150 company-owned stores in the U.S. and Puerto Rico, Canada, and Europe that sell Lucky products. In the United Arab Emirates and Australia, Lucky products can be found in David Jones department stores. In the U.S., Lucky is also sold at major department store chains including Bloomingdale's, Macy's, Lord & Taylor, Nordstrom, Belk, and Dillard's, as well as at smaller specialty chains like Buckle.

Lucky Foundation 
The Lucky Brand Foundation was first launched in 1996, which was initially established with a goal to help children.  Since the launch the foundation has raised over $8 million through fund raising events. Such events have featured rock performers such as Jackson Browne, Joe Cocker, B.B. King, and Bonnie Raitt. Another way the Foundation has been consistently successful at accomplishing their set goal is through the annual Black Tie & Blue Jeans Gala, which has a record of raising approximately $6 million for numerous children's charities including: Smile Train, Camp Sundown, Island Dolphin Care, Shane's Inspiration and The Bridge School.  With the celebration of the 40th anniversary of the Summer of Love and the Beatles' Sgt. Pepper's album, Lucky Foundation was able to raise more than $700,000.

References

External links 

Clothing brands of the United States
Jeans by brand
Companies based in Vernon, California
American companies established in 1990
Clothing companies established in 1990
1990 establishments in California
1990s fashion
2000s fashion
2010s fashion
2013 mergers and acquisitions
Companies that filed for Chapter 11 bankruptcy in 2020
Authentic Brands Group